Deadly Illusions is a 2020 Russian thriller film directed by Oleg Asadulin. It was theatrically released in Russia on November 19, 2020.

Plot 
The film tells about the famous illusionists, the Romanov brothers, who decide to prepare a grandiose show and end their joint performances. But at the beginning of this show, something went wrong.

Cast

References

External links 
 

2020 films
2020s Russian-language films
Russian thriller films